Claudio Francesconi (born 15 May 1945) is a retired Italian fencer. He competed in the individual and team épée events at the 1968 and 1972 Summer Olympics with the best result of sixth place with the Italian team in 1968.

References

1945 births
Living people
Italian male fencers
Olympic fencers of Italy
Fencers at the 1968 Summer Olympics
Fencers at the 1972 Summer Olympics
Fencers from Milan